The Bromide Formation is a geological formation in Oklahoma, USA. It is well known for its diverse echinoderm and trilobite fossil fauna.

Location 
The Bromide Formation crops out in the Arbuckle and Wichita Mountains and in the Criner Hills of Southern Oklahoma.  It appears at the surface in particular within Carter, Johnston, Murray and Pontotoc counties (34.0° N, 97.0° W).

Stratigraphy 
The Bromide Formation is the uppermost part of the Simpson Group, and originates from the Upper Ordovician (early Sandbian). This mostly carbonate succession is divided into the Mountain Lake and overlying Pooleville members.  Although it primarily consists of limestone, limestone interbedded with shale, and sandstone, also occur. The Bromide Formation is a shallow water marine sediment.

Much of the Mountain Lake Member comprises meter-scale, deep ramp cycles that overlie a lowstand systems tract of sandstones and sandy crinoidal grainstones. Cycle tops are starved surfaces with irregular, mineralized hardgrounds. The Pooleville Member consists of an early highstand interval of shallow subtidal carbonates and late highstand peritidal carbonates (Corbin Ranch Submember). Down-ramp, the Pooleville is represented largely by centimeter-thick shales and interbedded lime mudstones.

Economic use 
The Bromide Formation has been a source of oil and gas, with exploration slightly north of the area where the formation is exposed.

Origin 
The Bromide Formation was deposited in a shallow, storm-dominated epeiric sea that extended over part of the Laurentia continent, in what is today Southern Oklahoma. The sea spread into an area that sunk into a rift, that ultimately did not endure, a so-called aulacogen. Lying approximately at 30° Southern latitude, a low-land desert bordered much of the shallow sea from where well-rounded quartz sand blew in. This now represents the sandstone at the base of the Bromide Formation. Eventually, sea level rise caused by subsidence drowned the borderlands cutting off the supply of sand, and now the shales and limestones of the Middle Bromide (upper Mountain Lake Member) accumulated on a broad ramp. Gradually – primarily echinoderm – skeletons build up a carbonate shelf. Further eustatic sea level rise (transgression) cut off the supply of virtually all sediments from land, and remains of carbonate-producing organisms began filling the basin. This now forms the limestone of the upper Bromide (Pooleville Member). Finally, a drop in sea level (regression) exposed the entire platform, and became a broad, nearly featureless, hot, semi-arid sabkha.

Fossils 
Fossils have been found in the Bromide Formation of green algae, sponges, corals, graptolites, lampshells, moss animals, trilobites, clam shrimps, molluscs, several groups of echinoderms, and teeth of jawless fish. The animals we know from the fossil record from many well-known locations (including the Bromide Formation) can be viewed at a website that several paleontological institutions contributed to.

Green algae 
Ischadites iowensis

Sponges 
Dierespongia palla

Corals 
Saffordophyllum deckeri
Tetradium oklahomense
Tetradium spicululatum

Graptolites 
Dicellograptus gurlei
Dictyonema francesiae
Dictyonema rockcrossingensis
Diplograptus (Amplexograptus) maxwelli

Lampshells 

Acanthocrania erecta (mountain lake member?)
Acanthocrania oklahomensis (pooleville member)
Acanthocrania subquadrata (mountain lake member)
Ancistorhyncha costata (corbin branche member)
Ancistorhyncha globularis (pooleville member)
Athelelasma oklahomense (mountain lake member)
Bellimurina compressa (mountain lake member)
Bellimurina subquadrata (mountain lake member)
Camerella anteroplicata (pooleville member)
Camerella oklahomensis  (pooleville member)
Chaulistomella crassa  (mountain lake member)
Chaulistomella magna [=Dinorthis subquadrata] [=Valcourea magna] (pooleville member)
Chaulistomella mira (mountain lake member)
Chaulistomella mundula (mountain lake member)
Chaulistomella nitens (mountain lake member)
Chaulistomella obesa (mountain lake member)
Cliftonia occidentalis
Craniops tenuis (pooleville member)
Cyclospira parva (pooleville member)
Dactylogonia sculpturata parva (mountain lake member)
Dactylogonia subaequicostellata (mountain lake member)
Doleroides compressus (mountain lake member)
Doleroides oklahomensis (pooleville member)
Ectenoglossa cf. sculpta (pooleville member)
Fascifera dalmanelloidea (mountain lake member)
Glossella liumbona (pooleville member)
Glyptorthis costellata (pooleville member)
Glyptorthis crenulata (pooleville member)
Glyptorthis obesa (mountain lake member)
Glyptorthis uncinata (mountain lake member)
Hesperorthis crinerensis (mountain lake member)
Hesperorthis sulcata (pooleville member)
Lingulella galba (mountain lake member)
Lingulella cf. glypta (pooleville member)
Lingulasma oklahomense (pooleville member)
Macrocoelia bella (mountain lake member)
Mimella extensa (mountain lake member)
Mimella subquadrata (mountain lake member)
Multicostella sulcata (mountain lake member)
Murinella partita (mountain lake member)
Onychoplecia tenuis (mountain lake member)
Oepikina sp.
Oepikina expatiata (mountain lake member)
Oepikina extensa (pooleville member)
Oepikina formosa (pooleville member)
Oepikina gregaria (mountain lake member)
Orbiculoidea eximia (pooleville member)
Orthis tricrenata
Oxoplecia filosa (mountain lake member)
Oxoplecia gouldi (pooleville member)
Oxoplecia occidentalis
Pachyclossa biconvexa (pooleville member)
Paurorthis macrodeltoidea (pooleville member)
Petrocrania sp. (mountain lake member)
Petrocrania inflata (pooleville member)
cf. Philhedra sp. (mountain lake member)
Platymena cf. bellatula (pooleville member)
Plectorthis symmetrica
Protozyga costata (pooleville member)
Protozyga elongata (mountain lake member)
Protozyga loeblichi (pooleville member)
Protozyga magnicostata (mountain lake member)
Pseudolingula imperfecta
Oepikina minnesotensis [=Rafinesquina minnesotensis]
Rostricellula sp. (pooleville member)
Rostricellula cuneata (mountain lake member)
Rostricellula parva (pooleville member)
Rostricellula transversa (pooleville member)
Schizambon perspinosum (mountain lake member)
Skenidoides oklahomensis (mountain lake member)<ref name="Amsden"/
Skenidoides perfectus (pooleville member)
Sowerbyella sp. (mountain lake member)
Sowerbyella indistincta (mountain lake member)
Sowerbyella plicatifera (mountain lake member)
Sowerbyella variabilis (pooleville member)
Sowerbyella vulgata (mountain lake member)
Sowerbyites hami (pooleville member)
Sowerbyites lamellosus (mountain lake member)
Spirifer perlamellosus
Strophomena costellata (pooleville member)
Strophomena crinerensis (pooleville member)
Strophomena oklahomensis (pooleville member)
Valcourea transversa (mountain lake member)

Moss animals 
Anolotichia deckeri
Anolotichia impolita
Anolotichia spinulifera
Atactoporella bellula
Batostoma chapparsi
Batostoma cumingsi
Batostoma winchelli
Dekayella praenuntia echinata
Eridotrypa abrupta
Fistulipora cf. bassleri
Hallopora dubia
Hallopora macrostoma
Hallopora pachymura
Hemiphragma irrasum
Hemiphragma pulchrum
Heterotrypa taffi
Homotrypa callitoecha
Homotrypa multitabulata
Homotrypa sagittata
Homotrypa ulrichi
Mesotrypa favosa
Mesotrypa tubulifera
Monticuliporella croneisi
Monticuliporella peculiaris
Monticuliporella shideleri
Nicholsonella irregularis
Nicholsonella laminata
Nicholsonella moniliformis
Pachydictya bromidensis
Prasopora fritzae
Stromatotrypa frondosa

Arthropods

Trilobites 
Amphilichas subpunctatus
Apianurus sp.
Bumastoides milleri
Bumastus sp.
Calliops armatus
Calliops divaricatus
Calyptaulax annulata (Mountain Lake Member)
Ceratocephala graffhami
Ceraurus ruidus [=Eoceraurus trapezoidalis]
Cybeloides sp.
Dolichoharpes reticulata [=procliva] 
Estoniops? divaricatus
Failleana sp.
Frencrinuroides capitonis [=Encrinuroides capitonis]
Harpillaenus sp.
Illaenus americanus
Isoteloides sp.
Isotelus gigas
Lonchodomas mcgeheei
Nanillaenus punctatus
Otarion sp.
Pandaspinapyga salsa
Pliomerops canadensis (Mountain Lake Member)
Probolichas sp.
Remopleurides sp.
Sphaerocoryphe sp.
Thaleops jaanussoni (Mountain Lake Member)
Vogdesia bromidensis Shaw 1974 (Esker 1964) [=Homotelus bromidensis] (Mountain Lake Member)

Clam shrimps 
Bromidella reticulata
Bythocypris cylindrica
Cryptophyllus oboloides
Dicranella bicornis
Eridoconcha magna
Eridoconcha simpsoni
Eurychilina reticulata
Eurychilina ventrosa
Halliella labiosa
Krausella arcuata
Leperditella cf. deckeri
Leperditella inflata
Primitiopsis bassleri
Schmidtella umbonata
Ulrichia initialis

Molluscs 
Helicotoma umbilicata
Liospira vitruvia
Aristerella nitidula

Echinoderms

Sea urchins and sand dollars 
Bromidechinus rimaporus (Pooleville Member)

Edrioasteroids 
Cyathocystus oklahomae

Cystoids 

Amygdalocystites tribranchiatus
Anthracocrinus primitivus
Cheirocrinus ardmorensis
Cheirocrinus cf. loeblichi
Echinoencrinites cf. ornatus
Enoploura cf. papillata
Eumorphocystus multiporata
Glyptocytites loeblichae
Glyptocytites logani
Hesperocystus deckeri
Myeinocytites natus
Oklahomacystus tribranchiatus
Pararchaeocrinus decoratus
Platycystites bassleri
Platycystites bromidensis
Platycystites cristatus
Platycystites fimbratus
Platycystites levatus
Pleurocytites watkinsi
Quadrocystis graffhami 
Synclairocytis angulatus
Synclairocytis sulphurensis
Tanaocystis watkinsi
Traskocrinus sp.

Sea lilies 
Annulocrinus ramifer
Archaeocrinus subovalis
Calceocrinus longifrons
Carabocrinus treadwelli
Euptychocrinus skopaios
Hybocrinus crinerensis
Hybocrinus nitidus
Hybocrinus pyxidatus
Palaeocrinus hudsoni
Paracremacrinus laticardinalis

Chordates

Teeth of jawless fish (conodonts) 
Ansella crassa Bauer 1994
Ansella nevadensis (Ethington and Schumacher)
Baltoniodus gerdae (Bergström)
Bryantodina aequalis Bauer 1994 
Cahabagnathus sweeti (Bergström)Cardiodus abbreviatusCardiodus densusCardiodus robustusCordylodus sp.Curtognatus sp.Curtognatus cordiformisCurtognatus coronataCurtognatus limitarisEoplacognathus elongatus (Bergström)Erismodus typus Branson and Mehlcf. Leptochirognatus sp.Leptochirognatus extensacf. Microcoelodus sp.Microcoelodus asymmetricusMicrocoelodus inornatusMicrocoelodus intermediusMicrocoelodus minutidentatusMicrocoelodus typuis Oneotodus? ovatus (Stauffer)Oistodus suberectus Pharagmodus ambiguus Bauer 1994Phragmodus flexuosusPlectodina edentula Bauer 1994Polycaulodus bidentatusPolycaulodus tridentatusStaufferella falcata (Stauffer)Trichognatus obtusaTrucherognatus distortaTrucherognatus irregularisWalliserodus declivis'' Bauer 1994

References 

 
Ordovician System of North America
Ordovician geology of Oklahoma
Geologic formations of Oklahoma
Paleontology in Oklahoma
Ordovician southern paleotropical deposits